The Gullah are an African American ethnic group who predominantly live in the Lowcountry region of the U.S. states of Georgia, Florida, South Carolina, and North Carolina, within the coastal plain and the Sea Islands. Their language and culture have preserved a significant influence of Africanisms as a result of their historical geographic isolation and the community's relation to their shared history and identity. 

Historically, the Gullah region extended from the Cape Fear area on North Carolina's coast south to the vicinity of Jacksonville on Florida's coast. The Gullah people and their language are also called Geechee, which may be derived from the name of the Ogeechee River near Savannah, Georgia. Gullah is a term that was originally used to designate the creole dialect of English spoken by Gullah and Geechee people. Over time, its speakers have used this term to formally refer to their creole language and distinctive ethnic identity as a people. The Georgia communities are distinguished by identifying as either "Freshwater Geechee" or "Saltwater Geechee", depending on whether they live on the mainland or the Sea Islands.

Because of a period of relative isolation from whites while working on large plantations in rural areas, the Africans, enslaved from a variety of Central and West African ethnic groups, developed a creole culture that has preserved much of their African linguistic and cultural heritage from various peoples; in addition, they absorbed new influences from the region. The Gullah people speak an English-based creole language containing many African loanwords and influenced by African languages in grammar and sentence structure. Sometimes referred to as "Sea Island Creole" by linguists and scholars, the Gullah language is sometimes considered as being similar to Bahamian Creole, Barbadian Creole, Guyanese Creole, Belizean Creole, Jamaican Patois and the Sierra Leone Krio language of West Africa. Gullah crafts, farming and fishing traditions, folk beliefs, music, rice-based cuisine and story-telling traditions all exhibit strong influences from Central and West African cultures.

Etymology
The origin of the word "Gullah" can be traced to the KiKongo language, spoken around the Congo River's mouth from which the Gullah language dialects spoken by black Americans today come. Some scholars suggest that it may be cognate with the name Kongo, where the ancestors of some of the Gullah people likely originated. They created a new culture synthesized from that of the various African peoples brought into Charleston and other parts of South Carolina. Some scholars have suggested that it may come from the name of the Gola, an ethnic group living in the border area between present-day Sierra Leone and Liberia in West Africa, another area of enslaved ancestors of the Gullah people. British planters in the Caribbean and the Southern colonies of North America referred to this area as the "Grain Coast" or "Rice Coast"; many of the tribes are of Mandé or Manding origins. The name "Geechee", another common name for the Gullah people, may derive from the name of the Kissi people, an ethnic group living in the border area between Sierra Leone, Guinea, and Liberia.

Still another possible linguistic source for "Gullah" are the Dyula ethnic group of West Africa, from whom the American Gullah might be partially descended. The Dyula civilization had a large territory that stretched from Senegal through Mali to Burkina Faso and the rest of what was French West Africa. These were vast savanna lands with lower population densities. Slave raiding was easier and more common here than in forested areas with natural forms of physical defenses. The word "Dyula" is pronounced "Gwullah" among members of the Akan ethnic group in Ghana and Côte d'Ivoire. The primary land route through which captured Dyula people then came into contact with European slavers was the "Grain Coast" and "Rice Coast" (present-day Liberia, Sierra Leone, Senegambia, and Guinea). The story of Gullah Jack (an African slave trafficked from Angola to the United States) may indicate that the word Gullah originated in Angola, as some commentators believe the word is a shortened version of the country's name. Gullah Jack's other name was Jack Pritchard because he was sold to a white man with the last name Pritchard.

Some scholars have also suggested indigenous American origins for these words. The Spanish named the South Carolina and Georgia coastal region as Guale, after a Native American tribe. The name of the Ogeechee River, a prominent geographical feature in coastal Georgia and central to Guale territory, may have been derived from a Creek Indian (Muskogee language) word. Sapelo Island, the site of the last Gullah community of Hog Hammock, was also principal place of refuge for Guale people who also fled slavery on the mainland.  

The Gullah people have several West African words in their language that survived despite hundreds of years of slavery when African Americans were forced to speak English.

History

African roots

According to Port of Charleston records, African slaves shipped to the port came from the following areas: Angola (39%), Senegambia (20%), the Windward Coast (17%), the Gold Coast (13%), Sierra Leone (6%), and Madagascar, Mozambique, and the two Bights (viz., Benin and Biafra) (5% combined) (Pollitzer, 1999:43). The term "Windward Coast" often referred to Sierra Leone, so the total figure of slaves from that region is higher than 6%.

Particularly along the western coast, the local peoples had cultivated African rice for what is estimated to approach 3,000 years. African rice is a species related to, yet distinct from, Asian rice. It was originally domesticated in the inland delta of the Upper Niger River. Once Carolinian and Georgian planters in the American South discovered that African rice would grow in that region, they often sought enslaved Africans from rice-growing regions because they had the skills and knowledge needed to develop and build irrigation, dams and earthworks.

Two British trading companies based in England operated the slave castle at Bunce Island (formerly called Bance Island), located in the Sierra Leone River. Henry Laurens was their main contact in Charleston and was a planter and slave trader. His counterpart in Britain was the Scottish merchant and slave trader Richard Oswald. Many of the enslaved Africans taken in West Africa were processed through Bunce Island. It was a prime export site for slaves to South Carolina and Georgia. Slave castles in Ghana, by contrast, shipped many of the people they handled to ports and markets in the Caribbean islands.

After Freetown, Sierra Leone, was founded in the late 18th century by the British as a colony for poor blacks from London and black Loyalists from Nova Scotia resettled after the American Revolutionary War, the British did not allow slaves to be taken from Sierra Leone, protecting the people from kidnappers. In 1808 both Great Britain and the United States prohibited the African slave trade. After that date, the British, whose navy patrolled to intercept slave ships off Africa, sometimes resettled Africans liberated from slave trader ships in Sierra Leone. Similarly, Americans sometimes settled freed slaves at Liberia, a similar colony established in the early 19th century by the American Colonization Society. As it was a place for freed slaves and free blacks from the United States, some free blacks emigrated there voluntarily, for the chance to create their own society.

Origin of Gullah culture
 The Gullah people have been able to preserve much of their African cultural heritage because of climate, geography, cultural pride, and patterns of importation of enslaved Africans. Enslaved persons from the Central Western region of Africa, originating primarily from the Mende populations of what is today Sierra Leone, and transported to some areas of Brazil (including Bahia), the enslaved Gullah-Gheechee people were traded in what was then Charlestowne, South Carolina. According to British historian P.E.H. Hair, Gullah culture developed as a creole culture in the colonies and United States from the peoples of many different African cultures who came together there. These included the Baga, Fula, Kissi, Kpelle, Limba, Mandinka, Mende, Susu, Temne, Vai, and Wolof of the Rice Coast, and many from Angola, Yoruba, Igbo, Calabar, Congo and the Gold Coast.

By the middle of the 18th century, thousands of acres in the Georgia and South Carolina Lowcountry, and the Sea Islands were developed as African rice fields. African farmers from the "Rice Coast" brought the skills for cultivation and tidal irrigation that made rice farming one of the most successful industries in early America.

The subtropical climate encouraged the spread of malaria and yellow fever, which were both carried and transmitted by mosquitoes. These tropical diseases were endemic in Africa and might have been carried by enslaved Africans to the colonies. Mosquitoes in the swamps and inundated rice fields of the Lowcountry picked up and spread the diseases to European settlers, as well. Malaria and yellow fever soon became endemic in the region.

Because they had acquired some immunity in their homeland, Africans were more resistant to these tropical fevers than were the Europeans. As the rice industry was developed, planters continued to import enslaved Africans. By about 1708, South Carolina had a black majority. Coastal Georgia developed a black majority after rice cultivation expanded there in the mid-18th century. Malaria and yellow fever became endemic. Fearing these diseases, many white planters and their families left the Lowcountry during the rainy spring and summer months when fevers ran rampant. Others lived mostly in cities such as Charleston rather than on the isolated plantations, especially those on the Sea Islands.

The planters left their European or African "rice drivers", or overseers, in charge of the rice plantations. These had hundreds of laborers, with African traditions reinforced by new imports from the same regions. Over time, the Gullah people developed a creole culture in which elements of African languages, cultures, and community life were preserved to a high degree. Their culture developed in a distinct way, different from that of the enslaved African Americans in states such as North Carolina, Virginia, and Maryland, where the enslaved lived in smaller groups, and had more sustained and frequent interactions with whites and British American culture.

Civil War period
When the U.S. Civil War began, the Union rushed to blockade Confederate shipping. White planters on the Sea Islands, fearing an invasion by the US naval forces, abandoned their plantations and fled to the mainland. When Union forces arrived on the Sea Islands in 1861, they found the Gullah people eager for their freedom, and eager as well to defend it. Many Gullah served with distinction in the Union Army's First South Carolina Volunteers. The Sea Islands were the first place in the South where slaves were freed. Long before the War ended, Unitarian missionaries from Pennsylvania came to start schools on the islands for the newly freed slaves. Penn Center, now a Gullah community organization on Saint Helena Island, South Carolina, was founded as the first school for freed slaves.

After the Civil War ended, the Gullahs' isolation from the outside world increased in some respects. The rice planters on the mainland gradually abandoned their plantations and moved away from the area because of labor issues and hurricane damage to crops. Free blacks were unwilling to work in the dangerous and disease-ridden rice fields. A series of hurricanes devastated the crops in the 1890s. Left alone in remote rural areas of the Lowcountry, the Gullah continued to practice their traditional culture with little influence from the outside world well into the 20th century.

Recent history

In the 20th century, some plantations were redeveloped as resort or hunting destinations by wealthy whites.  Gradually more visitors went to the islands to enjoy their beaches and mild climate. Since the late 20th century, the Gullah people—led by Penn Center and other determined community groups—have been fighting to keep control of their traditional lands. Since the 1960s, resort development on the Sea Islands has greatly increased property values, threatening to push the Gullah off family lands which they have owned since emancipation. They have fought back against uncontrolled development on the islands through community action, the courts, and the political process.

The Gullah have also struggled to preserve their traditional culture in the face of much more contact with modern culture and media. In 1979, a translation of the New Testament into the Gullah language was begun. The American Bible Society published De Nyew Testament in 2005. In November 2011, Healin fa de Soul, a five-CD collection of readings from the Gullah Bible, was released. This collection includes Scipcha Wa De Bring Healing ("Scripture That Heals") and the Gospel of John (De Good Nyews Bout Jedus Christ Wa John Write). This was also the most extensive collection of Gullah recordings, surpassing those of Lorenzo Dow Turner. The recordings have helped people develop an interest in the culture, because they get to hear the language and learn how to pronounce some words.

The Gullah achieved another victory in 2006 when the U.S. Congress passed the "Gullah/Geechee Cultural Heritage Corridor Act"; it provided $10 million over 10 years for the preservation and interpretation of historic sites in the Low Country relating to Gullah culture. The Heritage Corridor will extend from southern North Carolina to northern Florida. The project will be administered by the US National Park Service, with extensive consultation with the Gullah community.

The Gullah have also reached out to West Africa. Gullah groups made three celebrated "homecomings" to Sierra Leone in 1989, 1997, and 2005. Sierra Leone is at the heart of the traditional rice-growing region of West Africa where many of the Gullahs' ancestors originated. Bunce Island, the British slave castle in Sierra Leone, sent many African captives to Charleston and Savannah during the mid- and late 18th century. These dramatic homecomings were the subject of three documentary films—Family Across the Sea (1990), The Language You Cry In (1998), and Priscilla's Homecoming (in production).

Customs and traditions

African influences 
The Gullah word guba for peanut derives from the Kikongo and Kimbundu  word N'guba.
Gullah rice dishes called "red rice" and "okra soup" are similar to West African "jollof rice" and "okra soup" and hog maws. Jollof rice is a traditional style of rice preparation brought by the Wolof people of West Africa.
The Gullah version of "gumbo" has its roots in African cooking. "Gumbo" is derived from a word in the Umbundu language of Angola, meaning okra, one of the dish's main ingredients.
Gullah rice farmers once made and used mortar and pestles and winnowing fanners similar in style to tools used by West African rice farmers.
Gullah beliefs about "hags" and "haunts" are similar to African beliefs about malevolent ancestors, witches, and "devils" (forest spirits).
Gullah "root doctors" protect their clients against dangerous spiritual forces by using ritual objects similar to those employed by African traditional healers.
Gullah herbal medicines are similar to traditional African remedies.
The Gullah "seekin" ritual is similar to coming of age ceremonies in West African secret societies, such as the Poro and Sande.
The Gullah ring shout is similar to ecstatic religious rituals performed in West and Central Africa.
Gullah stories about "Br'er Rabbit" are similar to West and Central African trickster tales about the figures of the clever and conniving rabbit, spider, and tortoise.
Gullah spirituals, shouts, and other musical forms employ the "call and response" method commonly used in African music.
Gullah "sweetgrass baskets" are coil straw baskets made by the descendants of enslaved peoples in the South Carolina Lowcountry. They are nearly identical to traditional coil baskets made by the Wolof people in Senegal.
Gullah "strip quilts" mimic the design of cloth woven with the traditional strip loom used throughout West Africa. Kente cloth from the Ashanti and the Ewe peoples, as well as Akwete cloth from the Igbo people are woven on the strip loom.
 An African song, preserved by a Gullah family in coastal Georgia, was identified in the 1940s by linguist Lorenzo Turner and found to be a Mende song from Sierra Leone. It is probably the longest text in an African language to survive the transatlantic crossing of enslaved Africans to the present-day United States. Later, in the 1990s, researchers Joseph Opala, Cynthia Schmidt, and Taziff Koroma located a remote village in Sierra Leone where the song is still sung today, and determined it is a funeral hymn. This research and the resulting reunion between a Gullah family and a Mende family that have both retained versions of the song is recounted in the documentary The Language You Cry In (1998).
 Some words coming from other African languages such as Yoruba, Fon, Ewe, Twi, Ga, Mende, and Bini are still used by Gullah people.
The Gullahs’ English-based creole language is strikingly similar to Sierra Leone Krio of West Africa and contains such identical expressions as bigyai ("greedy"), pantap ("on top of"), ohltu ("both"), tif ("steal"), yeys ("ear"), and swit ("delicious").

Cuisine 

The Gullah have preserved many of their west African food ways growing and eating crops such as Sea island red peas, Carolina Gold rice, Sea Island Benne, Sea island Okra, sorghum, and watermelon all of which were brought with them from West Africa. Rice is a staple food in Gullah communities and continues to be cultivated in abundance in the coastal regions of Georgia and South Carolina. Rice is also an important food in West African cultures. As descendants of enslaved Africans, the Gullah continued the traditional food and food techniques of their ancestors, demonstrating another link to traditional African cultures. 

Rice is a core commodity of the Gullah food system: a meal was not considered complete without rice. There are strict rituals surrounding the preparation of rice in the Gullah communities. First, individuals would remove the darker grains from the rice, and then hand wash the rice numerous times before it was ready for cooking. The Gullah people would add enough water for the rice to steam on its own, but not so much that one would have to stir or drain it. These traditional techniques were passed down during the period of slavery and are still an important part of rice preparation by Gullah people.

The first high-profile book on Gullah cooking was published in 2022 by Emily Meggett, an 89-year-old Gullah cook.

Celebrating Gullah culture

Over the years, the Gullah have attracted study by many historians, linguists, folklorists, and anthropologists interested in their rich cultural heritage. Many academic books on that subject have been published. The Gullah have also become a symbol of cultural pride for blacks throughout the United States and a subject of general interest in the media. Numerous newspaper and magazine articles, documentary films, and children's books on Gullah culture, have been produced, in addition to popular novels set in the Gullah region. In 1991 Julie Dash wrote and directed Daughters of the Dust, the first feature film about the Gullah, set at the turn of the 20th century on St. Helena Island. Born into a Gullah family, she was the first African-American woman director to produce a feature film.

Gullah people now organize cultural festivals every year in towns up and down the Lowcountry. Hilton Head Island, for instance, hosts a "Gullah Celebration" in February. It includes "De Aarts ob We People" show; the "Ol’ Fashioned Gullah Breakfast"; "National Freedom Day," the "Gullah Film Fest", "A Taste of Gullah" food and entertainment, a "Celebration of Lowcountry Authors and Books," an "Arts, Crafts & Food Expo," and "De Gullah Playhouse". Beaufort hosts the oldest and the largest celebration, "The Original Gullah Festival" in May. The nearby Penn Center on St. Helena Island holds "Heritage Days" in November. Other Gullah festivals are celebrated on James Island, South Carolina and Sapelo Island, Georgia.

Gullah culture is also being celebrated elsewhere in the United States. The High Art Museum in Atlanta has presented exhibits about Gullah culture. The Black Cultural Center at Purdue University in West Lafayette, Indiana conducted a research tour, cultural arts festival, and other related events to showcase the Gullah culture. The Black Cultural Center Library maintains a bibliography of Gullah books and materials, as well. Metro State College in Denver, Colorado recently hosted a conference on Gullah culture, called The Water Brought Us: Gullah History and Culture, which featured a panel of Gullah scholars and cultural activists. These events in Indiana and Colorado are typical of the attention Gullah culture regularly receives throughout the United States.

Cultural survival
Gullah culture has proven to be particularly resilient. Gullah traditions are strong in the rural areas of the Lowcountry mainland and on the Sea Islands, and among their people in urban areas such as Charleston and Savannah. Gullah people who have left the Lowcountry and moved far away have also preserved traditions; for instance, many Gullah in New York, who went North in the Great Migration of the first half of the 20th century, have established their own neighborhood churches in Harlem, Brooklyn, and Queens. Typically they send their children back to rural communities in South Carolina and Georgia during the summer months to live with grandparents, uncles, and aunts. Gullah people living in New York frequently return to the Lowcountry to retire. Second- and third-generation Gullah in New York often maintain many of their traditional customs and many still speak the Gullah language.

The Gullah custom of painting porch ceilings haint blue to deter haints, or ghosts, survives in the American South. Having also been adopted by White Southerners, it has lost some of its spiritual significance.

Representation in art, entertainment, and media

Gullah Gullah Island is an American musical children's television series that was produced by and aired on the Nick Jr. programming block on the Nickelodeon network from October 24, 1994, to April 7, 1998.[4] The show was hosted by Ron Daise - now the former vice president for Creative Education at Brookgreen Gardens in Murrells Inlet, South Carolina - and his wife Natalie Daise, both of whom also served as cultural advisors, and were inspired by the Gullah culture of Ron Daise's home of St. Helena Island, South Carolina, part of the Sea Islands.

Notable Americans with Gullah roots

See also

 Atlantic Creole
 Bilali Document
 Black Seminoles
 Bristol slave trade
 Coastwise slave trade
 Colonial South and the Chesapeake
 First Africans in Virginia
 Virginia Mixson Geraty
 Ambrose E. Gonzales
 Great Dismal Swamp maroons
 Igbo Landing
 Joseph Opala
 Port Royal Experiment
 Slavery in the colonial history of the United States
 Stono Rebellion
 Peter H. Wood
 Gullah language

References

 
African-American society
Articles containing video clips